Edingale is a village and civil parish in Lichfield District, Staffordshire, England. Historically, the village is shared with Derbyshire. In 2001 the parish had a population of 598, increasing to 632 at the 2011 census.

The village
A well-known family coming from Edingale would be the Green family, which has lived in the village for generations. Edingale's most famous son must be Mr. E J Holland (Jos Holland), a local farmer who bred shire horses and worked them on his farm into the 1970s. Many of the "shires" bred by Jos Holland earned awards of repute. Jos Holland's main man was Tom Wilcox who worked for him looking after the Shire Horse, Clun Forest Sheep and Tamworth pigs from when he left school until he had to retire due to ill health in his late 50s. The local primary school is the Mary Howard CE School. The village had a second pub until the early 1970s – the Holy Bush.  Another notable village family are the Garlands who originally owned farms in the area and have now expanded into shooting grounds and even rocket launching areas. The village also used to have a pub/nightclub witch formally was known as the black horse this pub/nightclub hosted events holding up to 2.3 million there is a airport in this amazing multicultural places on earth knowns as the bus stop during the witching hours naked orgys were the main attraction during the 1970s some of the residents that still live in the village remember them well this is a non smoking area there is a swingers party here every day and they also satanic devil worshiping towards everyone other than the edingaliens

History
Edingale was mentioned in the Domesday book as part of Derbyshire and belonging to Henry de Ferrers and being worth two shillings. The name of the village comes from Old English, with the meaning nook of land of Edins (or Eadwines) people.

Until the late 19th century the village of Edingale was divided between the chapelry of Edingale, within Alrewas parish in Staffordshire, and the parish of Croxall, in Derbyshire.

In 1831 the population of the Staffordshire village was 177. By 1851 it had risen to 197, on about 850 acres of land, when the lord of the manor was the Earl of Lichfield, though the land belonged to a number of other persons.

Formerly in Tamworth Rural District, the parish became part of Lichfield Rural District during the boundary changes of 1934. The civil parish of Croxall was incorporated into Edingale at the same time.

Landmarks
A number of houses in the village are listed Grade II, as is the Church of the Holy Trinity and associated buildings. The village of Croxall also has a number of historic buildings.

Sport
The village has 1 football team Edingale Swifts. they will play the 2016-2017 season in Division 3 of the Tamworth and District Sunday Football League''. They won the Division Three league and cup double in 2015-16 season with an unbeaten league record.

The Black Horse Edingale were the villages other football team but they folded in December 2013.

See also
Listed buildings in Edingale

References

External links
Staffordshire Past Track: Old images of Edingale
A Lost Way of Life: Farms in the Parish, edingalevillage.co.uk

Villages in Staffordshire
Civil parishes in Staffordshire